Fusulculus crenatus is a species of sea snail, a marine gastropod mollusk in the family Benthobiidae.

Description
The length of the shell attains 16.4 mm.

Distribution
This marine species occurs off the New Hebrides.

References

 Bouchet, P. & Vermeij, G., 1998. Two new deep-water Pseudolividae (Neogastropoda) from the south-west Pacific. The Nautilus 111(2): 47-52

crenatus
Gastropods described in 1998